Over The Wall is a UK charity that provides residential summer camps for children and their families coping with serious illnesses and conditions. It is a member of the SeriousFun Children's Network, a worldwide association of camps for seriously ill children. The charity was co-founded by Joe Woods and Paul Newman in 1999 as The Over The Wall Gang Camp in the style of the American Hole in the Wall Gang Camp set up by Paul Newman. 

 

Camp Programme
The camp currently provides around 10 camps a year for children and families affected by serious illness. All of the camps are provided completely free of charge.  There are currently three different types of camp offered throughout the year:
 Seriously ill children ages 8–17 years (5 nights)
 Siblings of seriously ill children aged 8–17 years (4 nights)
 Family groups, with a child with a serious illness (2 nights)
In 2013, the charity held summer camps in England and Scotland for 444 children between the ages of 8 and 17, with over 130 different medical conditions, including blood disorders, cancers and tumours, cerebral palsy, genetic disorders, epilepsy, heart conditions and many more, including extremely rare illnesses. The camps for siblings of children with serious illness are typically organised in the Easter Holidays, and shorter family camps are organised throughout the year.

Whilst at camp the children are able to try a wide variety of activities often including; wall climbing, abseiling, fishing, canoeing, horse riding, archery, swimming, arts and crafts, music, drama, sports, talent night and a disco.

Unlike other camps in the SeriousFun Children's Network, Over The Wall has no permanent site and holds camps in multiple locations in the UK, including at Bryanston School, Tulliallan Castle, and Strathallan School, allowing it to serve families from across the UK.

Aims of the Camps 
While hospitals and healthcare staff aim to take care of the physical aspects of serious illness in a child, living with a serious illness can impact children in a number of ways. The diagnosis of a serious illness at an early age, and the subsequent lengthy process of treatment and hospital visits are likely to result in a lack of confidence and self-esteem in most children. Over The Wall aims to rebuild their confidence and esteem through a programme of Therapeutic Recreation, all whilst letting children "kick back, relax and raise a little hell".

In summer of 2012, The Child Study Center at Yale Medical School began a study to measure the impact of SeriousFun camps on children with serious illness. 254 families using 12 SeriousFun camps including Over The Wall were studied and a number of outcomes were monitored one month after attending camp and then reevaluated six months after camp. The study found significant improvements in outcomes including self-esteem, maturity, independence, quality of life measures and positive coping strategies, which were still maintained at the six month follow-up.

References

External links
Over The Wall
 SeriousFun Children's Network

Summer camps for children with special needs
Charities for disabled people based in the United Kingdom
Children's charities based in the United Kingdom
1999 establishments in the United Kingdom